Semagystia dubatolovi is a moth in the family Cossidae. It was described by Yakovlev in 2007. It is found in Turkmenistan and Uzbekistan. It is found in the upper part of the juniper belt
near the border with the bush juniper subzone.

The length of the forewings is 12–14 mm. The forewings are grey. The hindwings are grey with a lighter basal part.

References

Natural History Museum Lepidoptera generic names catalog

Cossinae
Moths described in 2007